Juan Bell Mathey (March 29, 1968 – August 24, 2016) was a Dominican professional baseball player, who played Major League Baseball from  to , primarily as an infielder.

MLB career

Early career 

Orioles 
Bell was acquired along with Ken Howell and Brian Holton by the Baltimore Orioles from the Dodgers for Eddie Murray on December 4, 1988. He saw his first major league action the following season, getting called up from the minor leagues in September, . In , he got his chance at regular playing time, splitting time at second base with Billy Ripken alongside Billy's brother, Cal Ripken Jr., the Orioles' regular shortstop. However, he hit just .172, and the next spring he lost his roster spot to Mark McLemore and was sent back to the minors.

Phillies 
In August , Bell was traded to the Philadelphia Phillies for infielder Steve Scarsone and was back in the majors. In 46 games, as the regular shortstop over the remainder of the season, Bell hit .204, however it was enough to allow him to stick with the big club in spring training. Once again, however, Bell's bat was not up to the task, as he hit just .200 in 65 at bats before being placed on waivers.

Brewers 
Bell was claimed by the Milwaukee Brewers, who gave him his most extended shot at a regular job yet. Bell responded with what was his best season, batting .234 with career highs in home runs (5) and RBI (29). The following spring, he was released by the Brewers after they signed Jody Reed in the offseason to play second base.

Later career 
In the next two seasons, Bell would get additional trials from the Montreal Expos and Boston Red Sox. He spent most of those two seasons in the minor leagues, though, and continued to play in the minors until , finishing up his career with the Syracuse SkyChiefs in the Toronto Blue Jays system. Bell ended his career with a batting average of just .212 in 329 games.

Bell played some ball from 1999 to 2000 with Elmira Pioneers of the Northern League, as well as Cafeteros de Córdoba and Campeche Piratas of the Mexican League.

Personal life
Juan was the younger brother of former major league slugger George Bell. Their brother, Rolando Bell, played two seasons in the Dodgers' system as well. He had a son named Joanthony Bell.

Bell died of kidney disease in Santo Domingo, Dominican Republic on August 24, 2016.

References

External links

Juan Bell at Baseball Almanac

1968 births
2016 deaths
Albuquerque Dukes players
Bakersfield Dodgers players
Baltimore Orioles players
Boston Red Sox players
Cafeteros de Córdoba players
Dominican Republic expatriate baseball players in Canada
Dominican Republic expatriate baseball players in Mexico
Dominican Republic expatriate baseball players in the United States
Dominican Republic people of Cocolo descent
Deaths from kidney disease
Gulf Coast Dodgers players
Elmira Pioneers players
Harrisburg Senators players
Major League Baseball infielders
Major League Baseball players from the Dominican Republic
Major League Baseball second basemen
Major League Baseball shortstops
Mexican League baseball second basemen
Milwaukee Brewers players
Montreal Expos players
Oklahoma City 89ers players
Ottawa Lynx players
Sportspeople from San Pedro de Macorís
Pawtucket Red Sox players
Philadelphia Phillies players
Rochester Red Wings players
San Antonio Missions players
Syracuse SkyChiefs players
West Palm Beach Expos players